The 2022 World Junior Ice Hockey Championship Division I consisted of two tiered groups of six teams each: the second-tier Division I A and the third-tier Division I B. For each tier's tournament, the team which placed first was promoted to the next highest division, while the team which placed last was relegated to a lower division.

To be eligible as a junior player in these tournaments, a player couldn't be born earlier than 2002.

Division I A

The Division I A tournament was played in Hørsholm, Denmark, from 12 to 18 December 2021.

Participants

Match officials
Eight referees and linesmen were selected for the tournament.

Referees
 Daniel Eriksson
 Micha Hebeisen
 Miroslav Iarets
 Niclas Lundsgaard
 Chrisitan Ofner
 Zsombor Pálkövi
 Marcus Wannerstedt
 Marek Žák

Linesmen
 Albert Ankerstjerne
 Knut Bråten
 Uldis Bušs
 Emil Dalsgaard
 Henrik Haurum
 David Klouček
 Artsiom Labzov
 Simon Riecken

Final standings

Results
All times are local (UTC+1).

Statistics

Top 10 scorers

GP = Games played; G = Goals; A = Assists; Pts = Points; +/− = Plus-minus; PIM = Penalties In Minutes
Source: IIHF.com

Goaltending leaders
(minimum 40% team's total ice time)

TOI = Time on ice (minutes:seconds); GA = Goals against; GAA = Goals against average; Sv% = Save percentage; SO = Shutouts
Source: IIHF.com

Best Players Selected by the Directorate
 Goaltender:  Alexei Kolosov
 Defenceman:  Ole Julian Holm
 Forward:  Alexander Suvorov

Source: IIHF.com

Division I B

The Division I B tournament was played in Tallinn, Estonia, from 12 to 18 December 2021.

Participants

Match officials
Four referees and seven linesmen were selected for the tournament.

Referees
 Cedric Borga
 Yann Furet
 Alexander Samarin
 Vladimir Yefremov

Linesmen
 Emīls Druseiks
 Michał Gerne
 Onni Hautamäki
 Tadej Snoj
 Laurynas Stepankevičius
 Jason Thorrignac
 Toivo Tilku

Final standings

Results
All times are local (UTC+2).

Statistics

Top 10 scorers

GP = Games played; G = Goals; A = Assists; Pts = Points; +/− = Plus-minus; PIM = Penalties In Minutes
Source: IIHF

Goaltending leaders
(minimum 40% team's total ice time)

TOI = Time on ice (minutes:seconds); GA = Goals against; GAA = Goals against average; Sv% = Save percentage; SO = Shutouts
Source: IIHF

Best Players Selected by the Directorate
 Goaltender:  Georg Vladimirov
 Defenceman:  Bine Mašič
 Forward:  Tomas Simonsen

Source: IIHF

References

External links
Division I A
Division I B

I
World Junior Ice Hockey Championships – Division I
International ice hockey competitions hosted by Denmark
International ice hockey competitions hosted by Estonia
2021–22 in Danish ice hockey
2021–22 in Estonian ice hockey
Hørsholm Municipality
Sports competitions in Tallinn
IIHF